General Mills is an American cereal company.

General Mills may also refer to the following military officers:
Albert Leopold Mills (1854–1916), U.S. Army major general who was a recipient of the Medal of Honor
Anson Mills (1834-1924), U.S Army brigadier general, among other accomplishments
Arthur Mills (Indian Army officer) (1879–1964), British Indian Army major general
Graham Mills (1917–1992), British Army major general
John S. Mills (1906–1996), U.S. Air Force major general
Richard P. Mills (general) (born 1950), U.S. Marine Corps lieutenant general 
Samuel Meyers Mills Jr. (1842–1907), U.S. Army brigadier general
William Augustus Mills (1777–1844), U.S. Army major general in the War of 1812
General Mills (iZombie), a fictional U.S. Army general in the American comic book, iZombie